KYUN (102.1 FM, "The Bull") is a commercial radio station located in Twin Falls, Idaho. KYUN airs a country music format.

History
On February 10, 2016, KYUN rebranded from "102.1 The Canyon" to "102.1 The Bull".

References

External links

YUN
Country radio stations in the United States
Radio stations established in 2007